Berles-au-Bois is a commune in the Pas-de-Calais department in the Hauts-de-France region in northern France.

Geography

A farming village located 11 miles (17 km) southwest of Arras on the D62 junction with the D30 road.

Population

Sights
 Remains of a 13th-century château.
 The church of Saint-Pierre, rebuilt, like most of the village after the ravages of World War I.
 Three World War I cemeteries.

See also
Communes of the Pas-de-Calais department

References

External links

 The churchyard extension cemetery at Berles
 The field cemetery at Berles
 The CWGC cemetery at Berles

Communes of Pas-de-Calais